Wamo–Chapakúra is a proposed connection between the largely extinct Chapacuran language family and the otherwise unclassified language Wamo (or Guamo). Kaufman (1990) finds the connection convincing.

References
 

Proposed language families
Indigenous languages of the Americas